Gilbert Henry Dawson (August 27, 1930 – July 30, 2005) was a former halfback at the University of Texas and in the National Football League.

Career
Dawson was born in Bisbee, Arizona and become a high school football star in Douglas, AZ. He's a member of the Arizona High School Football Hall of Fame, was recognized as one of Arizona's 50 Greatest Athletes of all time and had his high school jersey retired in 1979.

Dawson was a two-time all-Southwest Conference running back at the University of Texas at Austin and the only Texas player ever to lead the Longhorns in five different offensive categories in the same season.

In 1951, he was named all-Southwest Conference, and led the team in total offense (714 yards), scoring (62 points), receiving (8 catches for 170 yards), rushing (74 carries for 671 yards and all purpose yards (939, including rushing, passing and 98 yards in kick returns). 

He was again named all-Southwest Conference running back in 1952, and after the summer after the season was over, was named the Most Valuable Player in the College All-Star game against the World Champion Detroit Lions. That season he also led the Longhorns in all-purpose yards, with 698 rushing, 167 receiving, 211 in kickoff returns and 84 in punt returns for a total of 1,160 yards. He was named to the Texas Longhorn Hall of Honor in 1984.

Dawson was drafted by the Green Bay Packers in the fourth round of the 1953 NFL Draft and played that season with the team. His career was cut short when he was drafted into the Army.

Later Life
After being discharged from the Army, Dawson went into business eventually becoming an executive with the Circle K Corporation in Tucson and Phoenix, AZ. He was had three children.

See also

 List of Green Bay Packers players

References

1930 births
2005 deaths
People from Bisbee, Arizona
Players of American football from Arizona
American football halfbacks
Texas Longhorns football players
Green Bay Packers players